George Humphrey Wolferstan Rylands  (23 October 1902 – 16 January 1999), known as Dadie Rylands, was a British literary scholar and theatre director. 

Rylands was born at the Down House, Tockington, Gloucestershire, to Thomas Kirkland Rylands, a land agent, and Bertha Nisbet Wolferstan (née Thomas). His grandfather was the Liberal politician Peter Rylands. Educated at Eton College and King's College, Cambridge, he was a Fellow of King's from 1927 until his death. While at Cambridge, he became a friend of John Maynard Keynes, also a student and Fellow at King’s. He also befriended Cecil Beaton there.

As well as studying Shakespeare, he was actively involved in the theatre. He directed and acted in many productions for The Marlowe Society, and was chairman of the Cambridge Arts Theatre from 1946 to 1982.

Rylands' 1939 Shakespeare anthology Ages of Man was the basis of John Gielgud's one-man show of the same title. Though Rylands specialised in directing university productions at Cambridge, he also directed Gielgud in professional productions of The Duchess of Malfi and Hamlet in London in 1945.

He was made a Commander of the Order of the British Empire (CBE) in 1961 and a Companion of Honour (CH) in 1987.

References

External links
George Rylands at Oxford Dictionary of National Biography

British theatre directors
1902 births
1999 deaths
Commanders of the Order of the British Empire
English theatre directors
Members of the Order of the Companions of Honour
People educated at Eton College
People from South Gloucestershire District
Alumni of King's College, Cambridge
Fellows of King's College, Cambridge